This is a list of Permanent Under-Secretaries for Scotland in the Civil Service. It should not be confused with the Parliamentary Under-Secretary of State for Scotland.

Office 
The political office of Secretary for Scotland was established in 1885 along with the establishment of the Scottish Office. In line with the secretaryship, a permanent under-secretaryship was created, to be occupied by a civil servant. The first office-holder was Francis Sandford. When the political office became the Secretary of State for Scotland in 1926, the permanent secretary also became Permanent Under-Secretary of State.

Permanent Under-Secretaries (of State) for Scotland 
The following were Permanent Under-Secretaries (of State) for Scotland:
 1885–1887: Sir Francis Richard John Sandford, KCB (later Baron Sandford).
 1888–1892: Robert William Cochran-Patrick.
 1892–1902: Colonel Sir Colin Scott-Moncrieff, KCSI.
 1902–1908: Sir Reginald Macleod of Macleod, KCB.
 1909–1921: Sir James Miller Dodds, KCB
 1921–1933: Sir John Lamb, KCB (Under-Secretary of State after 1926)
 1933–1937: Sir John Jeffrey, KCB, CBE FRSE
 1937: John Elborn Highton, CB
 1937–1946: Sir Horace Perkins Hamilton, GCB
 1946–1959: Sir David Milne, GCB
 1959–1964: Sir William Stuart Murrie, GCB, KBE
 1965–1973: Sir Thomas Douglas Haddow, KCB, FRSE
 1973–1978: Sir Nicholas Godfrey Morrison, KCB
 1978–1988: Sir William Kerr Fraser, GCB
 1988–1998: Sir Robert Russell Hillhouse, KCB, FRSE
 1998–1999: Alastair Muir Russell (later KCB)

Heads of the Scottish departments (Secretary grade) 
The Scottish Office was unusual in that it was federal in arrangement; the Secretary of State oversaw several separate Scottish departments via the Scottish Office; those departments were headed by a Secretary who was responsible directly to the Secretary of State, but would meet with the Permanent Under-Secretary of State at the Scottish Office regularly. The following is a list of those secretaries.

Secretary, Scottish Office Agriculture, Environment and Fisheries Department 
The Board of Agriculture for Scotland, which had been founded in 1912, was replaced in 1928 by the Department of Agriculture for Scotland with a new permanent secretary. Responsibility for fisheries was added in 1960 from the Scottish Home Department, and the department was then renamed the Department of Agriculture and Fisheries for Scotland. In 1991, it was renamed the Scottish Office Agriculture and Fisheries Department. In 1995, it was again renamed to the Scottish Office Agriculture, Environment and Fisheries Department.

As Board of Agriculture for Scotland
 1912–1918: Hugh Morison Conacher.
 1918–1928: Charles Weatherill (later CBE)

As Department of Agriculture for Scotland

 1928–1934: Sir Robert Blyth Greig, Kt, MC, FRSE
 1934–1953: Sir Patrick Ramsay Laird, KBE, CB, FRSE
 1953–1958: Sir Alexander Glen, KBE, CB, MC
 1958–1960: Sir Matthew Campbell, KBE, CB, FRSE

As Department of Agriculture and Fisheries for Scotland (from 1991 Scottish Office Department of Agriculture and Fisheries)

 1960–1968: Sir Matthew Campbell, KBE, CB, FRSE
 1968–1971: Harry Whitby, CB
 1971: William George Pottinger (CVO, later CB; both honours revoked in 1975)
 1972–1984: James Ian Smith, CB
 1984–1992: Loudon Pearson Hamilton, CB
 1992–1995: Kenneth John Mackenzie (later CB)

As Scottish Office Agriculture, Environment and Fisheries Department

 1995–1998: Alastair Muir Russell (later KCB)
 1998–1999: John Strathie Graham

Secretary, Scottish Office Development Department (1962–1999) 
Created in 1962 as the Scottish Development Department, it was renamed in 1991, becoming the Scottish Office Environment Department, but reverted to being the Scottish Office Development Department in 1995.

As Scottish Development Department

 1962–1964: Thomas Douglas Haddow, CB (later KCB)
1965–1973: Sir Alan Blythe Hume, Kt, CB
1973–1976: Kenneth Newis, CB, CVO
1976–1980: Eric Gillett
1980–1987: Tony Richard Hillier Godden, CB
1987–1990: Robert Gavin Loudon McCrone, CB

As Scottish (Office) Environment Department

1991–1992: Robert Gavin Loudon McCrone, CB
1992–1995: Harold Hernshaw Mills, CB

As Scottish Office Development Department

 1995–1998: Harold Hernshaw Mills, CB
1998–1999: Kenneth John Mackenzie (later CB)

Secretary, Scottish Office Industry Department  (1973–1995) 
Created in 1973 as the Scottish Economic Planning Department. It was renamed the Scottish Industry Department in 1983, and, like all departments it was prefixed with "Scottish Office" in 1991. The department's portfolio was merged with the Education Department in 1995.

 1973–1980: Tony Richard Hillier Godden, CB
1980–1983: Robert Gavin Loudon McCrone, CB

As Scottish (Office) Industry Department

 1983–1987: Robert Gavin Loudon McCrone, CB
1987–1990: James Archibald Scott, CB, LVO, FRSE
1990–1995: Peter Mackay, CB

Secretary, Scottish Office Education and Industry Department 
Formed in 1872 as the Scotch Education Department, renamed Scottish Education Department in 1918, Scottish Office Education Department in 1991 and Scottish Office Education and Industry Department in 1995.

 1872–1884: Francis Richard Sandford (later Baron Sandford, KCB).
1884–1885: Patrick Cumin, CB.
1885–1904: Sir Henry Craik, KCB.
1904–1921: Sir John Struthers, KCB
1922–1928: Sir George Macdonald, KCB
1928–1936: Sir William Wallace McKechnie, KBE, CB.
1936–1940: Sir James Wallace Peck, Kt, CB, FRSE
1940–1952: Sir John Mackay Thomson, Kt, CBE, FRSE (acting 1939)
1952–1957: Sir William Stuart Murrie, KBE, CB (later GCB)
1964–1973: Sir Norman William Graham, Kt, CB
1973–1976: John Martin Fearn, CB
 1976–1984: John Angus Macbeth Mitchell, CB, CVO, MC
 1984–1987: James Archibald Scott, LVO, FRSE (later CB)
1988–1999: Gerald Robertson Wilson, CB, FRSE

Secretary, Department of Health for Scotland (1929–1962) 
The Board of Health was established in 1919. In 1928, it became the Department of Health for Scotland, and merged with the Department of Health for Scotland in 1962 to form the Scottish Home and Health Department (see below).

As Scottish Board of Health
 1919–1928: John Jeffrey, CBE (later KCB)
As Department of Health for Scotland
 1929–1933: John Jeffrey, CBE, CB (later KCB)
 1933–1937: John Elborn Highton, CB
 1937–1939: William Scott Douglas, CB (later GCB, KBE)
 1939–1943: William Robert Fraser, CB (later KCB, KBE)
 1943–1953: Sir George Henry Henderson, KBE, CB
 1953–1956: Harold Ross Smith, CB
 1956–1959: Sir John Anderson, KBE, CB
1959–1962: Thomas Douglas Haddow, CB (later KCB)

Secretary, Scottish Home Department (1939–1962) 
Established in 1939 to take over functions of the Scottish Office, the Fishery Board for Scotland, and the Prisons Department for Scotland. Merged with the Department of Health for Scotland in 1962 to form the Scottish Home and Health Department (see below).

 1939–1942: Robert Norman Duke, CB (later KBE; on secondment with the Scottish Civil Defence Regional Office from September 1939)
1942–1946: Sir David Milne, KCB (later GCB)
1946–1948: Robert Norman Duke, CB (later KBE)
 1948–1957: Sir Charles Craik Cunningham, KBE, CB, CVO
1957–1959: Sir William Stuart Murrie, KBE, CB (later GCB)
 1959–1962: Sir John Anderson, KBE, CB

Secretary, Scottish Office Home and Health Department 
Formed by merger of the Scottish Home Department and the Department of Health for Scotland in 1962. It was renamed the Scottish Office Home and Health Department in 1991, and split up into the Scottish Office Health Department and the Scottish Office Home Department in 1995.

 1963–1972: Sir Ronald Ernest Charles Johnson, Kt, CB
1972–1977: Ronald Petrie Fraser, CB
 1977–1984: Archibald Louden Rennie, CB
 1984–1990: William Kennedy Reid, CB (later KCB)
 1990–1992: Graham Allan Hart, CB (later KCB)
1992–1995: James Hamill (later CB).

In 1995, the department was subsequently split into the Scottish Office Home Department and the Scottish Office Health Department. Hamill remained Secretary and Head of the Home Department, and was appointed CB in 1997. He was still in the office in 1999, when it was abolished on the formation of the devolved Scottish Executive. 

After 1995, the new Health Department had no secretary, but comprised several branches: the Management Executive for NHS in Scotland (the Chief Executive from 1993 to 1999 was Geoffrey Richard Scaife, CB), the Office of the Chief Scientist, the Public Health Policy Unit (the head of which was the Chief Medical Officer), Medical Services (also headed by the Chief Medical Officer) and Nursing Services (headed by the Chief Nursing Officer).

Secretary, Prisons Department for Scotland (1929–1939) 
The Prisons Department was established by the Reorganisation of Offices (Scotland) Act 1928; it was abolished by the Reorganisation of Offices (Scotland) Act 1939, and its functions were transferred to the newly established Scottish Home Department.

 1929–1935: Lt-Col. Randolph Eustace Wemyss Baird, OBE.
 1936–1939: Lt-Col. William Leith-Ross, MC.

Deputy Secretary, Central Services (1974–1991) 
The Deputy Secretary, Central Services, ranked equally with the Secretaries of each of the Departments, and formed part of the Scottish Office's management group (along with the Secretaries and Permanent Under-Secretary). The office-holder was responsible for matters of devolution, as well as the financial management of the Office and local authority finance. 

The office was established in response to the devolution policies of the Second Wilson Ministry; "it became imperative to create devolution units at high level but separate from the departments". The first appointment was Kerr Fraser, who held the post between 1975 and 1978. The office was abolished in 1991, after Ian Penman left. Responsibility for local government finance was transferred to the Environment Department (formerly the Development Department), while management responsibilities were vested in Gerry Wilson, secretary of the Education Department; this latter arrangement was not intended to be permanent, but reflected the "relative workload" of the different grade 2 officials.

 1975–1978: William Kerr Fraser, CB (later GCB)
1978–1984: William Kennedy Reid, CB (later KCB)
 1984–1991: Ian Dalgleish Penman, CB

References 

Civil service positions in the United Kingdom